Tom Gallop is an American actor. He is best known for his performance as Tom Cronin in Bourne and for playing recurring character Rob in Will & Grace.

Filmography

References

External links
 

Living people
American male film actors
American male television actors
Year of birth missing (living people)
University of Michigan alumni
New York University alumni